The Irish Women's Suffrage Federation (IWSF) was an organisation founded in 1911 to unite scattered suffrage societies in Ireland.

See also
Women's suffrage organizations
Timeline of women's suffrage
List of suffragists and suffragettes

References

Women's suffrage in Ireland
1911 establishments in Ireland
Suffrage